TUFF Phones are strengthened mobile phones, including rugged smartphones; designed, manufactured, and sold by TUFF Phones Ltd. of England.

Company history
TUFF Phones Ltd, registered in England and Wales, company registration number 07431588, is a United Kingdom (UK) based company specializing in mobile phones and smartphones.  TUFF Phones was established in 2010 as a retailer of several different brands of mobile phones.

In 2014, the company began working on ideas regarding production of its own range of smartphones.  A year later, talks began with a number of tier one manufacturers in mainland China on the pros and cons of different composite materials, shatterproof screens, and mobile operating systems.  Production on TUFF's phones began in early 2016 at Shenzhen in China.  A notice on the company website in July 2022 says that they are no longer in business.

Device ranges

The first generation of TUFF Phones products were released in Q3 2016, and featured four models of strengthened devices, including Gorilla glass touchscreens, and are certified to be dust-proof and waterproof.

2016 range
TUFF T300
TUFF T400 (4G)
TUFF T450
TUFF T1000
TUFF Phones updated their range of handsets early in 2017, with the launch of two new handsets, the TUFF T400s and TUFF T1.  They subsequently announced that the 2017 range will be increased later in Q2/Q3 2017, with the release of the TUFF T10 and TUFF T500.

2017 range
TUFF T400s
TUFF T1
TUFF T10
TUFF T500

Media 
Certain generations of TUFF phones have implemented a removable tray that allows for the installation of two nano SIM cards; which allows the user of the phone to make use of two different phone numbers for calling and texting for example, or one nano SIM card with one microSD card; which allows the user of the phone to use a single phone number and to increase the amount of storage capacity in the phone for music, pictures, contacts, etc.

References

External links
TuffPhones.co.uk — TUFF Phones Ltd official website
 

Manufacturing companies of the United Kingdom
Smartphones
British companies established in 2010
Manufacturing companies established in 2010